The Mad Marriage may refer to:

 The Mad Marriage (1921 film)
 The Mad Marriage (1925 film)